Muellerilepis is an extinct genus of conodonts.

The name is a tribute to German paleontologist Klaus J. Müller (1923-2010). It is a replacement generic name for Muellerina Bardashev et Bardasheva, 2012. which is preoccupied.

Muellerina idrisovi is from the Middle Devonian (Givetian) of Tajikistan.

References

External links 

Conodont genera
Devonian conodonts
Middle Devonian animals